E. Francis Thompson (January 3, 1908 – December 26, 2003) was an influential American film director, producer, and writer.

Thompson was born Ebenezer Francis Thompson on January 3, 1908, in Titusville, Pennsylvania, and commenced his career as a painter and art teacher before he directed his first film Evolution of a Skyscraper.

He is best known for the films, N.Y., N.Y. (1957), To Be Alive! (1964), and City Out of Wilderness (1974) and is credited with making the first IMAX film, To Fly (1976).

Thompson's style can most accurately be described as ciné-poème. In many of his films, Thompson employs a variety of kaleidoscopic lenses, distorting devices, and secretive techniques, turning his work into more of an abstract art installation than feature film. 

He won the 1965 Academy Award for Best Documentary (Short Subject) for To Be Alive! (1964), which he co-directed with Alexander Hammid. He was a member of the Directors Guild of America and the Academy of Motion Picture Arts and Sciences, with a 50-year career in filmmaking, retiring in 1987.

Thompson died on December 26, 2003, in New York at the age of 95.

References

External links 

Francis Thompson: An Analysis of an American Filmmaker; Cocking, Loren D.

1908 births
2003 deaths
American documentary filmmakers
Documentary film editors
American experimental filmmakers
American cinematographers
Directors of Best Documentary Short Subject Academy Award winners
American film directors
People from Titusville, Pennsylvania